Humaima Malick (born 18 November 1987) is a Pakistani actress who works in Pakistani films and serials. She is known for Ishq Junoon Deewangi as Pares Usmani and social-drama Bol in 2011.

Personal life
Malick was born in Quetta into a Pashtun family. She graduated from Government Girls College Quetta and then moved to Karachi along with her family following her father's retirement. Malick has one brother, Feroze Khan, and one sister, Dua Malik. Singer Sohail Haider is her brother-in-law. Malick was previously married to Shamoon Abbasi.

Career

Early work (2009–2011) 

Malick started her career as a model at the age of fourteen, through a Unilever Pakistan campaign. She first walked the ramp for fashion designer Deepak Perwani at the age of fourteen. Since then she has appeared in fashion shows for numerous designers.

Malick made her acting debut with the serial Ishq Junoon Deewangi. She then appeared in Barish Kay Ansoo, Tanveer Fatima (B.A), Talluq, and Akbari Asghari.

Film career 

Malick made her film debut in Shoaib Mansoor's Bol. In 2012, she appeared in Shehzad Rafique's Ishq Khuda. In 2014, she starred in Kunal Deshmukh's Raja Natwarlal opposite Emraan Hashmi, which was her debut film in Bollywood. She then starred in Asad Ul Haq's Dekh Magar Pyaar Say, alongside Sikander Rizvi.

In 2017, she played the role of a film star in Pakistani film Arth 2, co-starred and directed by Shaan Shahid.

Malick appeared in Bilal Lashari's action-drama  The Legend of Maula Jatt.

Filmography

Films 

 All films are in Urdu unless otherwise noted.

Television

Awards and nominations

See also 
 List of Pakistani models
 List of Pakistani actresses

References

External links

 Humaima Official Instagram 
 

Living people
1987 births
People from Quetta
Actresses from Karachi
Pakistani female models
Pakistani television actresses
Pakistani film actresses
Actresses in Urdu cinema
Actresses in Hindi cinema
Pakistani expatriate actresses in India
Lux Style Award winners
21st-century Pakistani actresses